Choeusu is a North Korean sporting goods manufacturing unit. It operates under the authority of the Ministry of Physical Culture and Sports and has been the official kit provider for the North Korea national football team since 2014. Choeusu also produces footballs, volleyballs and goal-netting, among others.

References 

Sportswear brands
North Korea at multi-sport events